The 8th annual Seagram's Live (also known as the Seagram's Gin Live Tour) was a co-headlining concert tour by American recording artists Mýa and Clipse. The short club tour ran for 11 shows in North America, in April 2007.

Opening act
Jovan Dais

Tour dates

References

2007 concert tours
Co-headlining concert tours